Saint-André is community in Saint-André Parish, Madawaska County, New Brunswick, Canada. It was part of an eponymous rural community prior to 2023; the most recent census data is for the rural community.

Situated in a potato farming area, Saint-André was founded in 1904.

History

On 1 January 2023, the rural community of Saint-André amalgamated with the town of Grand Falls. The community's name remains in official use.

Demographics

Mother tongue language (2016)

Notable people

See also
List of communities in New Brunswick

References

Communities in Madawaska County, New Brunswick
Former rural communities in New Brunswick